Adam Storey McKinlay (27 December 1887 – 17 March 1950) was a Scottish Labour Party politician. He was a Member of Parliament (MP) from 1929 to 1931, and from 1941 to 1950.

McKinlay was born in Govan, Glasgow in December 1887 to Hugh McKinlay and Lizzie Storey.

At the 1929 general election, McKinlay was elected as MP for Glasgow Partick.  He was defeated in 1931 and was unsuccessful when he stood again in 1935. He also stood unsuccessfully in the 1935 Perth by-election.  He returned to the House of Commons when he won a by-election in on 27 February 1941 for the Dunbartonshire constituency.  He was re-elected in 1945 and when that constituency was abolished at the 1950 general election, he was returned for the new West Dunbartonshire constituency, holding that seat until his death the following month. McKinlay died in Anniesland, Glasgow from coronary artery thrombosis at the age of 62.

References

External links 
 

1887 births
1950 deaths
Amalgamated Society of Woodworkers-sponsored MPs
Scottish Labour MPs
Members of the Parliament of the United Kingdom for Glasgow constituencies
People from Govan
Politicians from Glasgow
Transport and General Workers' Union-sponsored MPs
UK MPs 1929–1931
UK MPs 1935–1945
UK MPs 1945–1950
UK MPs 1950–1951